Tiroler Wasserkraft AG (TIWAG) is an Austrian company that generates electricity from hydropower based in Innsbruck, Austria. 

The company mainly produces electricity through hydropower. The company operates several hydropower plants in the Tyrol region of Austria, including the Kühtai, Pitztal, and Martell power plants. Tiroler Wasserkraft is owned by Verbund, Austria's leading electricity company.

It operates the Amlach power station on the river Drava.

References

External links
 

Companies based in Innsbruck
Electric power companies of Austria
Austrian brands